Until 308 BC Carthage was ruled, at least officially, by monarchs, in the sense of the word that executive power was held by one person.  It also seems for the time period below to have been passed down in the clan of the Magonids.  The title itself was most likely Suffete.

Didonian
 Dido 814 – c. 760 BC (queen)
 unknown
  Hanno I  c. 580 – c. 556 BC
 Malchus  c. 556 – c. 550 BC

Magonids
 Mago I c. 550 – c. 530 BC
 Hasdrubal I c. 530 – c. 510 BC
 Hamilcar I c. 510–480 BC
 Hanno II 480–440 BC
 Himilco I (in Sicily) 460–410 BC
 Hannibal I 440–406 BC
 Himilco II 406–396 BC
 Mago II 396–375 BC
 Mago III 375–344 BC
 Hanno III 344–340 BC

Hannonian
 Hanno I 340–337 BC
 Gisco 337–330 BC
 Hamilcar II 330–309 BC
 Bomilcar 309–308 BC

In 480 BC, following Hamilcar I's death, the king lost most of his power to an aristocratic Council of Elders. In 308 BC, Bomilcar attempted a coup to restore the monarch to full power, but failed, which led to Carthage becoming a republic.

References

Carthage